Andrew or Andy Davis may refer to:

Sports
 Andy Davis (American football) (1927–2007), Washington Redskins player

Others
 Andrew Davis (conductor) (born 1944), British conductor
 Andrew Davis (businessman), founder and chairman of von Essen Hotels
 Andrew Davis (director) (born 1946), American film director
 Andrew Jackson Davis (1826–1910), American spiritualist
 Andrew M. Davis, professor of astronomy and geophysics at the University of Chicago
 Andy Davis (Toy Story), fictional character in the film Toy Story

See also
 Andrew Davies (disambiguation)